Tyssul "Tuss" Griffiths (6 June 1919 – 25 August 1978) was a Welsh rugby union, and professional rugby league footballer who played in the 1940s and 1950s.

Background
Tuss" Griffiths was born in Bridgend, Wales, and he died aged 59 in Leeds, West Yorkshire, England.

Rugby union career
Griffiths was born on 6 June 1919 in Blaengarw, Bridgend. He made his rugby union début for Newport RFC in October 1945. Griffiths represented Wales while at Newport RFC in the 'Victory International', but was not awarded a cap.

Rugby league career

Hunslet
Griffiths switched to rugby league, and joined Hunslet in 1946, and went on to make 167 appearances for the club.

Doncaster
Griffiths, who had been transfer listed by Hunslet, was signed by newly-founded Doncaster in July 1951. He played in Doncaster's inaugural league game on 18 August 1951, scoring two conversions in a 10–3 victory over Wakefield Trinity. He played 59 games for Doncaster, and was the club's top points scorer for the 1951–52 and 1952–53 seasons.

Halifax
In December 1952, Griffiths was signed by Halifax for a fee of around £1,000. He played  in Halifax's 4-4 draw with Warrington in the 1954 Challenge Cup Final during the 1953–54 season at Wembley Stadium, London on Saturday 24 April 1954, in front of a crowd of 81,841, in front of a crowd of 81,841, and played , and kicked two penalty goals (2 points each) in the 4-8 defeat by Warrington in the 1954 Challenge Cup Final replay during the 1953–54 season at Odsal Stadium, Bradford on Wednesday 5 May 1954, in front of a record crowd of 102,575 or more, and played , and kick a goal in Halifax's 2-13 defeat by St. Helens in the 1955–56 Challenge Cup Final during the 1955–56 season at Wembley Stadium, London on Saturday 28 April 1956, in front of a crowd of 79,341.

Griffiths is one of less than twenty-five Welshmen to have scored more than 1000-points in their rugby league career.

International honours
Griffiths won two caps for Wales; his first appearance was in 1946 while at Hunslet, and he won his second cap in 1951 as a Doncaster player.

References

External links
 Welsh stars still had a rugby ball in wartime
Photograph "Halifax's Griffiths lands a penalty - Another view of the world record crowd. - Date: 05/05/1954" at rlhp.co.uk

1919 births
1978 deaths
Dewsbury Rams players
Doncaster R.L.F.C. players
Footballers who switched code
Halifax R.L.F.C. players
Hunslet F.C. (1883) players
Newport RFC players
Rugby league fullbacks
Rugby league players from Bridgend
Rugby union fullbacks
Rugby union players from Bridgend
Wales international rugby union players
Wales national rugby league team players
Welsh rugby league players
Welsh rugby union players